Deon Bosman Kotzé (born 12 September 1973) is a former Namibian cricketer. He was a right-handed batsman and a right-arm off-break bowler.

Kotzé played six One Day Internationals in the Cricket World Cup in 2003, when he captained Namibia. He played in the ICC Trophy and other ICC List A competitions from 1994, when he made his debut against Israel, until 2009, when he played in the World Cup qualifiers.

References

External links

1973 births
Living people
Cricketers from Windhoek
Namibian cricket captains
Namibia One Day International cricketers
Namibian cricketers